The George Tambling and Ninette Stocker Miller House, located in Hillsboro, New Mexico, is a Late Victorian vernacular house built in 1894.  It was listed on the National Register of Historic Places in 1995.

It was built of black slag blocks.  It was built of recycled gold ore.

It was built for George Tambling Miller (b.1866) and his wife Ninette Stocker Miller by contractors Peter Galles and J.M. Lewis.

It is located on the south side of Elenora St., west of Union Church.

The listing included a second contributing building: an open-front, frame garage with a metal roof.

References

National Register of Historic Places in Sierra County, New Mexico
Victorian architecture in New Mexico
Houses completed in 1894